Scott Anthony Starr is an Australian born goalkeeper coach and an ex-professional goalkeeper. He was the goalkeeper coach of the Singapore women's national football team and is also the head coach of a goalkeeper academy known as the Starrkeeper Academy in Singapore.

References

Association football goalkeepers
Expatriate sportspeople in Singapore
Australian soccer players
1972 births
Living people